Pieter Van Brugh (1666 – July 1740) was the Mayor of Albany, New York from 1699 to 1700 and from 1721 to 1723.

Early life and family
Pieter Van Brugh was a member of the Dutch aristocracy of Albany.  Pieter Van Brugh was the oldest son of Johannes Pieterse Van Brugh  and Catharina Roeloffs (sometimes shown as Trijntje Roeloffs).  His father, Johannes Pieterse van Brugh, had made a fortune by migrating from the Netherlands to New Netherland and exporting furs and other natural resources from Manhattan.   Pieter's maternal grandparents were from Norway. Roeliff Jansen (1602–1637) was born in  Marstrandsön,  a small island situated in Bohuslän province in Norway, today a part of  Kungälv Municipality, Västra Götaland County, Sweden. Anneke Jans (later Anneke Jantz Bogardus) (1605–1663) was born on Flekkerøy,  an island situated outside the town of Kristiansand, Vest-Agder county, Norway.

His sister, Catharina, married Hendrick van Rensselaer, the son of Rensselaerswyck patroon, Jeremias van Rensselaer.

Career
After serving time as a militia lieutenant in New York City, Van Brugh entered the family business and lived with his wife's family in Albany.  He became a constable in 1692 followed by several other public duties in the following years.  In 1697, he inherited the Cuyler's home.

In 1699, Van Brugh's prominence led to his appointment as Mayor of Albany which he held until the following year.  In September 1700, he was part of an expedition that traveled west into the Iroquois country in an attempt to establish a fort among the Onondaga. In the following decades, he became one of the wealthiest businessmen in Albany and was named mayor for a second time from 1721 to 1723.

Personal life
In November 1688, Van Brugh married Sara Cuyler. Uncharacteristic for the era, the couple had only one child:
Catharina Van Brugh (born in 1689), who married Philip Livingston (1686–1749), the second lord of Livingston Manor.

By the time he died in 1740, Van Brugh and his wife had twelve grandchildren and had raised several orphaned nieces but had no sons thereby ending the Van Brugh family name in Albany.  Van Brugh was one of the last people to be interred beneath Albany Dutch Reformed Church.

Descendants
Pieter was the great-granduncle of American Revolutionary War soldier, Peter Gansevoort.

See also
 History of Albany, New York

References
Notes

Sources
Pieter Van Brugh - Biography written by Stefan Bielinski at New York State Museum web site.
Sara Cuyler Van Brugh - Biography written by Stefan Bielinski at New York State Museum web site.
Johannes Pieterse Van Brugh and Trijntje Roeloffs - The Genealogy of Walter Gilbert
 Roelof (Roeloffse) Jansen Scandinavian Immigrants In New York 1630 - 1674 by John O. Evjen

Related Reading
Bowers, Virginia (1997) Mayors of Albany, 1686-1997 : biographical sketches (Albany, NY: City Club of Albany)  
Zabriskie, George Olin, The Founding Families of New Netherland—The Roelofs and Bogardus Families (de Halve Maen, vol. 48, no. 2, July, 1973, Part IV, p. 9.)

1666 births
1740 deaths
18th-century American businesspeople
18th-century American politicians
American people of Dutch descent
American people of Norwegian descent
Businesspeople from Albany, New York
Cuyler family
Mayors of Albany, New York
Members of the New York General Assembly
Military personnel from New York City
Politicians from New York City
Van Brugh family